The Omega Butler Refinery is a proposed oil refinery to be built on 121-acres of land in Rivers State, Nigeria. It will have a capacity of 20,000 barrels per day, along with 90% yield of light oil products. Once established, the refinery will reduce fuel cost, create up to 1500 jobs, and contribute to the state's economic growth.

Operational licenses have since been granted by the Department of Petroleum Resources (DPR) to facilitate the commencement and execution of the project. On 27 May 2015, it was announced that ₦96 billion (US$ 480 million) has been budgeted for engineering procurement, construction, supervision and project management services.

See also

Port Harcourt Refining Company

References

Buildings and structures in Rivers State
Economy of Rivers State
Energy in Rivers State
Oil refineries in Nigeria
Proposed energy infrastructure in Nigeria